The name Rick has been used for six tropical cyclones in the Pacific Ocean.

In the eastern Pacific (5):
 Hurricane Rick (1985), strong category 4 hurricane, never a threat to land
 Hurricane Rick (1997), weak category 2 hurricane, made landfall near Puerto Escondido, Oaxaca
 Hurricane Rick (2009), powerful category 5 hurricane, the third-most intense Pacific hurricane on record, made landfall near Mazatlán, Sinaloa, as a tropical storm
 Tropical Storm Rick (2015), weak tropical storm, never threatened land
 Hurricane Rick (2021), strong category 2 hurricane, made landfall near Lázaro Cárdenas, Michoacán.

In the western Pacific (1):
 Tropical Storm Rick (1996), minimal storm that stayed away from land

Pacific hurricane set index articles
Pacific typhoon set index articles